The Magic is a 2012 self-help and spirituality book written by Rhonda Byrne. It is the third book in The Secret series. The book was released on March 6, 2012, as a paperback and e-book. The book is available in 41 languages.

See also 
The Hero
The Power
The Secret

References

Further reading
 

2012 non-fiction books
Australian books
New Age books
Self-help books
Quantum mysticism
Atria Publishing Group books